Alston is a town in Montgomery County, Georgia, United States, with a population of 178 at the 2020 census. It is part of the Vidalia Micropolitan Statistical Area.

History
The community was named after Alex Alston, a pioneer citizen. A post office has been in operation at Alston since 1910. Alston incorporated in 1910.

Alston was the location of the murder of resident Isaiah Nixon, who was shot in his front yard in front of his wife and six children on Sept. 8, 1948, after voting in the Georgia Democratic primary.

Geography
Its eastern border is the Toombs County line.

Georgia State Route 135 runs through the town, leading north  to Higgston and southwest  to Uvalda.

Demographics

As of the census of 2000, there were 159 people, 63 households, and 44 families residing in the town. There were 72 housing units at an average density of 25.2 per square mile (9.7/km2). The racial makeup of the town was 86.79% White and 13.21% African American.

There were 63 households, out of which 31.7% had children under the age of 18 living with them, 58.7% were married couples living together, 7.9% had a female householder with no husband present, and 28.6% were non-families. 25.4% of all households were made up of individuals, and 17.5% had someone living alone who was 65 years of age or older. The average household size was 2.52 and the average family size was 3.04.

In the town, the population was spread out, with 25.2% under the age of 18, 6.3% from 18 to 24, 28.3% from 25 to 44, 25.2% from 45 to 64, and 15.1% who were 65 years of age or older. The median age was 38 years. For every 100 females, there were 93.9 males. For every 100 females age 18 and over, there were 88.9 males.

The median income for a household in the town was $41,250, and the median income for a family was $48,500. Males had a median income of $33,750 versus $23,750 for females. The per capita income for the town was $18,110. About 4.0% of families and 4.5% of the population were below the poverty line, including none of those under the age of eighteen and 6.3% of those sixty five or over.

References

Towns in Montgomery County, Georgia
Towns in Georgia (U.S. state)
Vidalia, Georgia, micropolitan area